In photometry, luminous energy is the perceived energy of light. This is sometimes called the quantity of light. Luminous energy is not the same as radiant energy, the corresponding objective physical quantity. This is because the human eye can only see light in the visible spectrum and has different sensitivities to light of different wavelengths within the spectrum. When adapted for bright conditions (photopic vision), the eye is most sensitive to light at a wavelength of 555 nm. Light with a given amount of radiant energy will have more luminous energy if the wavelength is 555 nm than if the wavelength is longer or shorter. Light whose wavelength is well outside the visible spectrum has a luminous energy of zero, regardless of the amount of radiant energy present.

The SI unit of luminous energy is the lumen second, which is unofficially known as the talbot in honor of William Henry Fox Talbot. In other systems of units, luminous energy may be expressed in basic units of energy.

Explanation
Luminous energy  is related to radiant energy  by the expression

Luminous energy is the integrated luminous flux in a given period of time:

See also
Coefficient of utilization
Radiant energy

References 

Physical quantities
Photometry